is a passenger railway station in located in the city of Higashiōmi,  Shiga Prefecture, Japan, operated by the private railway operator Ohmi Railway.

Lines
Shin-Yōkaichi Station is served by the Ohmi Railway Yōkaichi Line, and is located 0.7 rail kilometers from the terminus of the line at Yōkaichi Station.

Station layout
The station consists of two unnumbered side platforms connected to the station building by a level crossing. The station is unattended.

Platforms

Adjacent stations

History
It was renamed to its present name on July 1, 1919. The station building was built in 1922. The second floor of the station building was once used as the head office of the Konan Railway and Yokaichi Railway, which were the predecessors of the Yokaichi Line.

Passenger statistics
In fiscal 2019, the station was used by an average of 501 passengers daily (boarding passengers only).

Surroundings
 Yōkaichi Post Office
 Japan National Route 421

See also
List of railway stations in Japan

References

External links

 Ohmi Railway official site 

Railway stations in Japan opened in 1913
Railway stations in Shiga Prefecture
Higashiōmi